Roland Varga (born August 6, 1990) is a Canadian canoeist. Varga immigrated with his family to Canada when he was 15. Varga currently resides in Aurora, Ontario.

Career
Varga has competed as part of the national team since 2009. His first multi-sport games was the 2011 Pan American Games in Guadalajara where he was disqualified in the C-1 1000 event. In 2012 along with partner, Paul Bryant, competed on the World Cup Circuit, with their top placing being a C-2 500m silver in 2013. Also in 2013, Varga competed in both the U23 and senior ICF World Championships. At the former, he finished fourth in the C-2 1000m with Marc Tarling. At the latter, Varga and Bryant won the B final in the C-2 500m.

In 2014, Varga raced with Gabriel Beauchesne-Sévigny during the World Cup calendar, and made the A Final in three of four races. In 2015, Varga had a decided to stop paddling, after he had a disappointing national trials. However, seven months later Varga decided to come back after his hiatus.

In 2016, Varga continued on the World Cup team and with Bryant advanced to A finals in all three races, finishing as high as fourth place. In 2018, Varga formed a C-2 boat with Connor Fitzpatrick. They won the C-2 1000m B final in their first World Cup event in Szeged, Hungary and the following week they advanced to the A final. At the World Championships, they placed sixth in the B final of the C-2 1000m. 

In 2019, Varga and Fitzpatrick broke the National record at the 2019 World Championships in the C-2 1000m to 3:28.742 in semifinals before finishing second in the B final (11th overall). In May 2021, Varga along with Fitzpatrick were named to their first Olympic team in the C-2 1000 event.

References

1990 births
Canadian male canoeists
Living people
Sportspeople from Budapest
Canoeists at the 2011 Pan American Games
Hungarian emigrants to Canada
Sportspeople from Aurora, Ontario
Canoeists at the 2020 Summer Olympics
Olympic canoeists of Canada